Whitton is a village within the borough of Stockton-on-Tees and the ceremonial county of  County Durham, England. It is situated to the north west of Stockton-on-Tees, near Stillington and Thorpe Thewles.

Landmarks
Approximately  to the south of the village is Whitton Bridge Pasture, a  Site of Special Scientific Interest  notable for its species-rich grassland.

References

External links

Villages in County Durham
Borough of Stockton-on-Tees
Places in the Tees Valley